The 1922 St. Louis Cardinals season was the team's 41st season in St. Louis, Missouri and its 31st season in the National League. The Cardinals went 85–69 during the season and finished tied for 3rd place with the Pirates in the National League. This was the first season to feature the now-famous birds on bat logo.

Offseason 
The club, just as it was preparing to leave for spring training, lost Bill "Pickles" Dillhoefer, a backup catcher, who died of pneumonia on February 23.

Regular season 
The 1922 season was one of the productive seasons in the career of Rogers Hornsby. He became the only player in history to hit over 40 home runs and bat over .400 in the same season. Hornsby won the triple crown, leading the league in almost every batting category including batting average (.401), home runs (42, a National League record at the time), RBI (152), slugging average (.722, another record at the time), on-base percentage (.459), doubles (46), hits (250, again the highest in National League history to that point), and runs scored (141). His 450 total bases was the highest mark for any National League player during the 20th century. Hornsby also produced in the field, leading the league in putouts, double plays, and fielding percentage.

Season standings

Record vs. opponents

Roster

Player stats

Batting

Starters by position 
Note: Pos = Position; G = Games played; AB = At bats; H = Hits; Avg. = Batting average; HR = Home runs; RBI = Runs batted in

Other batters 
Note: G = Games played; AB = At bats; H = Hits; Avg. = Batting average; HR = Home runs; RBI = Runs batted in

Pitching

Starting pitchers 
Note: G = Games pitched; IP = Innings pitched; W = Wins; L = Losses; ERA = Earned run average; SO = Strikeouts

Other pitchers 
Note: G = Games pitched; IP = Innings pitched; W = Wins; L = Losses; ERA = Earned run average; SO = Strikeouts

Relief pitchers 
Note: G = Games pitched; W = Wins; L = Losses; SV = Saves; ERA = Earned run average; SO = Strikeouts

Awards and honors

League leaders 
Rogers Hornsby, National League batting champion

Records 
Rogers Hornsby, National League record, Most total bases by a second baseman, (450).
Rogers Hornsby, National League record, Most hits by a second baseman, (250).
Rogers Hornsby, National League record, Most home runs by a second baseman, (42).
Rogers Hornsby, National League record, Most runs batted in by a second baseman, (152).

Farm system

References

External links
1922 St. Louis Cardinals at Baseball Reference
1922 St. Louis Cardinals team page at www.baseball-almanac.com

St. Louis Cardinals seasons
Saint Louis Cardinals season
St Louis